Tobias Drevland Lund (born 11 May 1996) is a Norwegian politician.

He was elected representative to the Storting from the constituency of Telemark for the period 2021–2025, for the Red Party.

References

1996 births
Living people
Red Party (Norway) politicians
Politicians from Telemark
Members of the Storting